Pamela Rose Martinez (born June 15, 1989) is an American professional wrestler. She is currently signed to WWE, where she performs on the Raw brand under the ring name Bayley, and the leader of the faction Damage CTRL.

From 2008 to 2012, she wrestled on the independent circuit under the ring name Davina Rose. Martinez signed with WWE in 2012 and was assigned to the NXT brand, where she adopted the ring name Bayley (as opposed to Bailey, Martinez chose "Bayley" as she represents the Bay Area). In 2015, she won the NXT Women's Championship, and subsequently won the 2015 NXT Year-End Awards for Female Competitor of the Year and Match of the Year for her confrontation with Sasha Banks at NXT TakeOver: Brooklyn.

Bayley held the WWE Raw Women's Championship, the WWE SmackDown Women's Championship and the WWE Women's Tag Team Championship, making her the first women's Triple Crown Champion and Grand Slam winner in WWE history. Bayley holds the record for the longest singular SmackDown Women's Championship reign at 380 days. Additionally, she won the 2019 Money in the Bank ladder match and was the first woman to defend a WWE title in Saudi Arabia.

Early life 
Pamela Rose Martinez was born on June 15, 1989, in San Jose, California and grew up in a Mexican-American family. She attended Independence High School in San Jose and once played as a captain of the school's basketball team, as well as participating in track and martial arts.

Professional wrestling career

Independent circuit (2008–2012) 
Martinez had been attending shows by Big Time Wrestling, a professional wrestling promotion in Northern California, since she was 11. In April 2008, she started her professional wrestling career at the age of 18, by attending Big Time Wrestling's training classes by her head trainer Jason Styles, which was one of the reasons why Martinez considered Big Time Wrestling as her home promotion. She had her first match in September 2008. On the American independent circuit, Martinez wrestled under the ring name Davina Rose. Rose wrestled for Big Time Wrestling from 2008 to 2012. Between 2011 and 2012, Rose branched out to wrestle for other promotions such as NWA Championship Wrestling from Hollywood, Pro Wrestling Destination and Shine Wrestling.

In October 2010, Rose first met her mentor Serena when they teamed together for a tag team match. In October 2011, Rose made her debut for Shimmer Women Athletes. At the tapings of Shimmer Volume 41–44, she became embroiled in Serena's feud with the Canadian Ninjas (Portia Perez and Nicole Matthews). At the tapings, Rose lost all four matches, including her debut match against Mercedes Martinez. In 2012, Rose continued to wrestle for Shimmer and on Volume 58, she teamed with Mia Yim to defeat Melanie Cruise and Mena Libra, receiving her first victory; on Volumes 51 and 52, Rose picked up her first two singles victories in Shimmer with wins over Cherry Bomb and Rhia O'Reilly.

WWE

Early NXT appearances (2012–2015) 

In December 2012, Martinez signed with WWE. In January 2013, Martinez made her debut for WWE's developmental territory NXT at a live event, wrestling under a mask as Luchadora for one match, teaming with Paige and Charlotte to defeat Summer Rae, Audrey Marie and Emma in a six-woman tag team match. She adopted the ring name Bayley and made her NXT television debut in a loss to Paige on the March 20 episode. On June 12, Bayley adopted a new character of a doe-eyed fangirl, losing to Alicia Fox in the first round of the NXT Women's Championship tournament to crown the inaugural champion. On August 21, Bayley unsuccessfully challenged AJ Lee for the Divas Championship. On September 4, for her first win, Bayley and Charlotte defeated Alicia Fox and Aksana. To Charlotte's annoyance, The BFFs—Beautiful, Fierce Females (Sasha Banks and Summer Rae), attempted to convince Bayley to join them, but this led to Charlotte attacking Bayley during their match against the BFFs on November 13, promptly joining the BFFs instead.

On May 1, 2014, Bayley failed to advance in a tournament for the vacant NXT Women's Championship after losing to Banks in the first round. After pinning Charlotte in a tag team match, Bayley defeated Sasha Banks to become the number one contender to Charlotte's NXT Women's Championship, but she was unsuccessful in capturing the title at NXT TakeOver: Fatal 4-Way on September 11, and in a rematch that took place on October 2. In mid-October, after losing to Banks, Bayley was attacked by her former friend Becky Lynch, who allied with Banks, and she later formed an alliance with former rival Charlotte to feud with Banks and Lynch throughout the following several weeks. On the November 27 episode, Bayley was attacked by Banks and Lynch, injuring her knee in the storyline. She returned on the January 21, 2015 episode, saving Charlotte from an attack by Banks and Lynch, before reluctantly attacking Charlotte herself. At NXT TakeOver: Rival on February 11, Bayley competed in a fatal four-way match for the NXT Women's Championship but failed to capture the title.

NXT Women's Champion (2015–2016) 
In March, Bayley began a feud with Emma after criticizing Bayley for her niceness, claiming it had prevented her from winning the NXT Women's Championship. This led to a match between the two on the April 1 episode, which Bayley won. On the April 29 episode, Bayley was defeated by Dana Brooke after a distraction by Emma. She gained revenge on Emma the following week, attacking her after her loss to Charlotte. At NXT TakeOver: Unstoppable on May 20, Bayley and Charlotte defeated Emma and Brooke. On the May 27 episode, Bayley lost to Emma; she and Charlotte were attacked by her and Brooke after the match. After a short hiatus, Bayley returned from a broken hand injury on the July 22 episode, defeating Emma and setting her sights on the NXT Women's Championship, thus ending their feud.

In August, after defeating Charlotte, Bayley defeated Becky Lynch to become the #1 contender for the NXT Women's Championship. At NXT TakeOver: Brooklyn on August 22, Bayley defeated Sasha Banks to win the NXT Women's Championship, celebrating with her, Lynch and Charlotte after the match. In a rematch between the two, contested in the main event of NXT TakeOver: Respect on October 7, in the first ever women's 30-minute Iron Man match in WWE history, Bayley defeated Banks with three falls to two after securing the third fall with three seconds left in the match to retain the title. Throughout her championship, Bayley went on to fend off title contenders such as Alexa Bliss, Eva Marie, Nia Jax and Carmella.

On the March 16, 2016 episode of NXT, after Bayley and Asuka won a tag team match, NXT general manager William Regal announced that Bayley would defend her championship against Asuka at NXT TakeOver: Dallas on April 1, where Bayley lost the championship to Asuka, ending her reign at 223 days. After a brief hiatus from in-ring competition, Bayley returned on the May 18 episode after being challenged by Nia Jax to a match which she lost. After being replaced by Jax at NXT TakeOver: The End on June 8 due to a storyline injury which made her unable to compete in a rematch for the NXT Women's Championship against Asuka, Bayley made her return on June 22, defeating Deonna Purrazzo. On the July 27 episode, Bayley asked Regal for a rematch against Asuka for the NXT Women's Championship at NXT TakeOver: Brooklyn II, which he granted. At the event on August 20, Bayley failed to regain the title in what was her final match in NXT.

Raw Women's Champion (2016–2017) 
At Battleground on July 24, Bayley made her main roster debut in a one-off appearance as Sasha Banks' mystery tag team partner, defeating Charlotte and Dana Brooke. Her official main roster debut came on the August 22 episode of Raw, being established as part of the brand by Raw general manager Mick Foley and challenging the Raw Women's Champion Charlotte to a title match; she refused and instead forced her protégé Brooke to face her, whom Bayley defeated. At Clash of Champions on September 25, Bayley failed to win the championship from Charlotte in a triple threat match, which also included Banks. At Hell in a Cell on October 30, Bayley defeated Brooke. At Survivor Series on November 20, Bayley survived alongside Charlotte Flair as members of Team Raw, but was attacked by Flair after the match.

On January 2, 2017, Bayley defeated Jax to become the #1 contender for Flair's Raw Women's Championship. At the Royal Rumble on January 29, Bayley failed to win the title from Flair. She earned a rematch after she, Cesaro and Sheamus defeated Flair, Gallows and Anderson the next night on Raw, with Bayley pinning Flair. Two weeks later on the February 13 episode, Bayley defeated Flair in the main event to win the Raw Women's Championship after an assist from Banks. At Fastlane on March 5, Bayley retained the title against Charlotte due to a distraction from Banks, in turn giving Charlotte her first pay-per-view loss. At WrestleMania 33 on April 2, she retained the title against Charlotte, Banks and Jax in a fatal four-way elimination match. At Payback on April 30, Bayley lost the title to Alexa Bliss, ending her reign at 76 days. On June 4 at Extreme Rules, she failed to regain the title in a kendo stick on a pole match. In July, Bayley again became the #1 contender for the championship after defeating Banks and was slated to face Bliss at SummerSlam on August 20, but she suffered a separated shoulder injury which left her unable to perform. Bayley returned from her injury on the September 18 episode of Raw to help Banks fend off Bliss and Jax. At No Mercy six days later, she lost a fatal five-way match for the Raw Women's Championship.

The Boss 'n' Hug Connection (2017–2019) 

On November 19, 2017, at Survivor Series, Bayley was again part of Team Raw in a five–on–five elimination tag team match but was eliminated by Tamina. Towards the end of the year, Bayley, alongside Sasha Banks and Mickie James, started a feud with Absolution (Paige, Mandy Rose and Sonya Deville) that led to various singles and tag team matches, mostly won by Absolution. On January 28, 2018, at the Royal Rumble, Bayley competed in the inaugural women's Royal Rumble match, entering at #29, but was eliminated by Banks. At Elimination Chamber on February 25, Bayley took part in the first women's Elimination Chamber match, where she was eliminated by Alexa Bliss after Banks pushed her off a pod. At the WrestleMania 34 kick-off show on April 8, Bayley competed in the inaugural WrestleMania Women's Battle Royal, where she eliminated Banks, and was the last woman eliminated from the match by Naomi.

On the March 26 episode of Raw, after weeks of animosity, including Bayley betraying Banks during their matches, Bayley and Banks brawled backstage and had to be separated. The two faced off in mid-April but their match ended in a no-contest after The Riott Squad (Ruby Riott, Liv Morgan and Sarah Logan) interfered and attacked them both. Throughout mid-2018, Bayley and Banks continued to attack each other, and were told to attend counselor meetings to help maintain their friendship. In July, the two reconciled and created a tag team known as The Boss 'n' Hug Connection. On October 28, Bayley took part in the first ever all women's pay–per–view Evolution, teaming with Banks and Natalya in a winning effort against The Riott Squad. At Survivor Series on November 18, Bayley competed as part of Team Raw, where she was eliminated via countout after a brawl with Sonya Deville outside the ring. On January 27, 2019, at the Royal Rumble, Bayley entered the Royal Rumble match at #27, but was eliminated by Charlotte Flair and Nia Jax.

At Elimination Chamber on February 17, Bayley and Banks won the inaugural WWE Women's Tag Team Championship by lastly eliminating Mandy Rose and Sonya Deville in a six tag team Elimination Chamber match. They made their first successful title defense at Fastlane on March 10 against Nia Jax and Tamina. At WrestleMania 35 on April 7, they lost the titles to The IIconics in a fatal four-way match, ending their reign at 49 days.

SmackDown Women's Champion (2019–2021) 
On April 16, Bayley was drafted to the SmackDown brand as part of the Superstar Shake-up, disbanding her team with Banks, who remained on Raw. At The Shield's Final Chapter on April 21, Bayley and Ember Moon defeated The Riott Squad. At Money in the Bank on May 19, Bayley won the Money in the Bank ladder match, granting her a women's championship match at any time of her choosing. Later that same night, she would cash in her briefcase and defeated Charlotte Flair to win the SmackDown Women's Championship for the first time. This win made her the first WWE Women's Grand Slam winner in WWE history. Bayley then feuded with Alexa Bliss and Nikki Cross, defeating Bliss once at Stomping Grounds on June 23, and retaining the title against the two in a handicap match at Extreme Rules on July 14. At SummerSlam on August 11, Bayley successfully defended the title against Ember Moon.

On the September 2 episode of Raw, Bayley helped Sasha Banks attack Becky Lynch with a steel chair, turning heel for the first time in her career. The following night on SmackDown Live, Bayley justified her attacking on Lynch, explaining that she was only helping Banks because of their friendship. On September 15 at Clash of Champions, Bayley retained the title after using an exposed turnbuckle, but lost the title to Flair at Hell in a Cell on October 6, ending her reign at 140 days. On the October 11 episode of SmackDown, Bayley debuted a new look, having cut off her ponytail and attacking the inflatable tube men (called "Bayley Buddies") during her entrance, then regaining the championship from Flair again. On the November 1 episode of SmackDown, Bayley retained her title against Nikki Cross after interference from Banks, and after the match, all three women were attacked by Shayna Baszler. 

At Survivor Series on November 24, Bayley faced Raw Women's Champion Becky Lynch and NXT Women's Champion Shayna Baszler in a non-title triple threat match, which Baszler won. On the November 29 episode of SmackDown, she started a feud with Lacey Evans after Bayley and Banks insulted the women of the SmackDown roster for their loss at Survivor Series; Evans attacked Banks. At Royal Rumble on January 26, 2020, she retained the title against Evans. On the following SmackDown, Bayley claimed that she had beaten every woman on the roster, and Naomi interrupted, taking exception to the claim as Bayley had never beaten her, beginning a feud between the two. On the February 14 episode of SmackDown, Bayley retained her title against Carmella. At Super ShowDown on February 27, in what was the first women's championship match contested in Saudi Arabia, Bayley defeated Naomi to retain the title.  On March 8, Bayley surpassed Charlotte Flair's reign of 147 days, thus becoming the longest-reigning SmackDown Women's Champion. On the March 20 episode of SmackDown, Bayley and Banks came to the ring saying that they were going to skip WrestleMania 36 this year, but they were interrupted by Paige, who announced that Bayley would defend her title against Naomi, Lacey Evans, Dana Brooke (who was later removed from the match), Tamina, and Sasha Banks in a six-pack elimination match at WrestleMania 36. At the second night of the event on April 5, Bayley retained the title after lastly pinning Evans. At Money in the Bank on May 10, Bayley retained the title against Tamina after a distraction from Banks.

On the June 5 episode of SmackDown, Bayley and Banks defeated Alexa Bliss and Nikki Cross to win the Women's Tag Team Championship for the second time, making Bayley a double champion. At Backlash on June 14, Bayley and Banks retained the titles in a triple threat tag team match against Bliss and Cross and The IIconics. Bayley successfully defended her title twice against Nikki Cross, first at The Horror Show at Extreme Rules on July 19, and then on the July 31 episode of SmackDown. She also retained her title against Asuka at SummerSlam on August 23. At Payback on August 30, Bayley and Banks lost the Women's Tag Team Championship against the newly formed team of Nia Jax and Shayna Baszler. On the September 4 episode of SmackDown, after failing to win the titles in a rematch, Bayley turned on Banks once again by attacking her, disbanding their team. At Clash of Champions on September 27, after retaining her title against Asuka, she was attacked by Banks. On the October 9 episode of SmackDown, Bayley retained against Banks via disqualification, and in a backstage segment later that night, Banks challenged Bayley to another title match at Hell in a Cell inside the eponymous structure, which was confirmed the next day. At the event on October 25, Bayley lost the SmackDown Women's Championship to Sasha Banks by submission, ending her reign at 380 days. At Survivor Series on November 22, Bayley was the self-appointed captain of team SmackDown, but was eliminated by Peyton Royce.

At the Royal Rumble on January 31, 2021, Bayley was the first entrant, but was eliminated by eventual winner Bianca Belair. On the second night of WrestleMania 37 on April 11, Bayley came out and started insulting the hosts Hulk Hogan and Titus O'Neil, only to get beaten up by The Bella Twins. Bayley would then start a feud with Belair, facing her for the SmackDown Women's Championship at WrestleMania Backlash on May 16 and at Hell in a Cell inside of the eponymous structure on June 20, both in a losing effort. She was booked to face Belair again in an "I Quit" match at Money in the Bank on July 18, but on July 9, WWE announced that Bayley suffered a torn ACL during training at the WWE Performance Center in Orlando that would sideline her for nine months. After the 2021 WWE Draft, she was left undrafted due to the injury, therefore making her a free agent.

Damage CTRL (2022–present) 

At SummerSlam on July 30, 2022, Bayley returned after a year out of action, forming an alliance with Iyo Sky and Dakota Kai while confronting Belair after her Raw Women's Championship defense against Becky Lynch, resuming their feud and moving Bayley back to the Raw brand. On the August 8 episode of Raw, they challenged Belair, Alexa Bliss, and Asuka to a six-woman tag team match at Clash at the Castle, which they accepted. At the event on September 3, Bayley, Kai and Sky, under the name Damage CTRL, defeated Belair, Bliss and Asuka. On the September 26 episode of Raw, Bayley challenged Belair to a ladder match for the Raw Women's Championship at Extreme Rules, which she accepted. At the event on October 8, Bayley failed to win the title. At Crown Jewel on November 5, Bayley failed to win the title in a Last Woman Standing match. Three weeks later At Survivor Series WarGames on November 26, Damage CTRL competed in a WarGames match, teaming with Nikki Cross and Rhea Ripley against Belair, Bliss, Asuka, Mia Yim and Becky Lynch but lost when Lynch pinned Kai after a diving legdrop from the top of the cage through a table. At the Royal Rumble on January 28, 2023, Bayley entered the Women's Royal Rumble match at #6 eliminating 5 women including Lynch before being eliminated by Liv Morgan.

Professional wrestling style and persona 
When beginning her WWE career, Bayley was depicted as a "hugger", coming out with multiple inflatable skydancers during her entrances as well as hugging many fans (particularly younger children) in attendance. For the first month as a villain, she was depicted as a hypocrite, acting as nothing had changed with her entrance music and in-ring gear remaining intact, despite developing villainous traits and underhanded tactics. On October 11, 2019, Bayley debuted a new look, having cut her ponytail off, destroying her inflatable tube men, and using profanity against the fans in her post-match promo. She now calls herself a role model for little girls around the world.

In the ring, Bayley utilizes her finisher of the belly-to-belly suplex calling it the Bayley-to-Belly Suplex. Since her heel turn, however, she has started utilizing an old finisher previously used on the independent circuit, an arm trap headlock driver known as the Rose Plant.

Other media 
Martinez is playable in six WWE video games, making her video game debut in WWE 2K17, and appearing again in WWE SuperCard, WWE 2K18, WWE 2K19, WWE 2K20,WWE 2K Battlegrounds,WWE 2K22 and WWE 2K23

Personal life 
Martinez cites Bret Hart, Eddie Guerrero, The Hardy Boyz, Ivory, John Cena, Lita, Randy Orton, Randy Savage, Rey Mysterio, The Rock, Triple H, Trish Stratus, and Victoria as her influences in wrestling.

Martinez was previously engaged to fellow professional wrestler Aaron Solo, whom she met in 2010. The engagement was called off on February 21, 2021.

Martinez has a dog named Flex.

Championships and accomplishments 

 BBC
 BBC Love Letter to Wrestling Champion (1 time, inaugural) - with Seth Rollins - 
 Busted Open
 Tag Team of the Year (2020) – 
 CBS Sports
 Tag Team of the Year (2020) – 
 Inside The Ropes Magazine
 Female Wrestler of the Year (2020)
 Pro Wrestling Illustrated
 Feud of the Year (2020) 
 Inspirational Wrestler of the Year (2015, 2016)
 Match of the Year (2015) 
 Tag Team of the Year (2020) – 
 Ranked No. 1 of the top 100 female singles wrestlers in the PWI Women's 100 in 2020
 Ranked No. 3 of the top 50 tag teams in the PWI Tag Team 50 in 2020 – 
 Rolling Stone
 NXT Match of the Year (2015) 
 Title Feud of the Year, NXT (2015) 
 Sports Illustrated
 Ranked No. 6 of the top 10 wrestlers in 2020
 Ranked No. 8 of the top 10 women's wrestlers in 2019 – 
 Wrestling Observer Newsletter
 Most Improved (2015)                                                                                                                                                                                                                            
 Worst Feud of the Year (2018) vs. Sasha Banks                                                                                                                                                                                                                                                              
 Women's Wrestling MVP (2020)
 WWE
 NXT Women's Championship (1 time)
 WWE Raw Women's Championship (1 time)
 WWE SmackDown Women's Championship (2 times)
 WWE Women's Tag Team Championship (2 times, inaugural) – with Sasha Banks
 Women's Money in the Bank (2019)
 First WWE Women's Triple Crown Champion
 First WWE Women's Grand Slam Champion
 NXT Year-End Award (2 times)
 Female Competitor of the Year (2015)
 Match of the Year (2015) 
 Ranked No. 10 of the top 50 Greatest WWE Female Superstars of all time (2021)
 Slammy Award (2 times)
 Double-Cross of the Year (2020) – 
 Social Media Superstar of the Year (2020)
 Bumpy Award (1 time)
 Tag Team of the Half-Year (2020) – with Sasha Banks
 Social Superstar of the Half-Year (2021)

References

External links 
 
 
 
 
 

1989 births
Living people
American female professional wrestlers
American professional wrestlers of Mexican descent
People from Newark, California
Professional wrestlers from California
WWE Grand Slam champions
NXT Women's Champions
21st-century American women
American actresses of Mexican descent
21st-century professional wrestlers
WWE Raw Women's Champions
WWE SmackDown Women's Champions
WWE Women's Tag Team Champions